George Henry Exley (15 November 1911 – February 1990), also known by the nickname of 'Mick', was an English rugby union, and professional rugby league footballer who played in the 1920s, 1930s and 1940s, and  coached  rugby league in the 1940s.

Background
Exley was born in Wakefield, West Riding of Yorkshire, England, he worked at Yorkshire Electric Transformer Company, Brewery Lane, Thornhill Lees, and he died aged 78.

Playing career

International honours
Mick Exley won caps for England (RL) while at Wakefield Trinity in 1932 against Wales, in 1933 against Other Nationalities, and in 1939 against France.

Mick Exley was selected for Great Britain (RL) while at Wakefield Trinity for the 1936 Great Britain Lions tour of Australia and New Zealand.

County honours
Mick Exley won cap(s) for Yorkshire (RL) while at Wakefield Trinity.

Challenge Cup Final appearances
Mick Exley played left-, i.e. number 11, in Wakefield Trinity's 13–12 victory over Wigan in the 1945–46 Challenge Cup Final during the 1945–46 season at Wembley Stadium, London on Saturday 4 May 1946, in front of a crowd of 54,730.

County Cup Final appearances
Mick Exley played right-, i.e. number 12, in Wakefield Trinity's 0–8 defeat by Leeds in the 1932–33 Yorkshire County Cup Final during the 1932–33 season at Fartown Ground, Huddersfield on Saturday 19 November 1932, played right- in the 5–5 draw with Leeds in the 1934–35 Yorkshire County Cup Final during the 1934–35 season at Crown Flatt, Dewsbury on Saturday 27 October 1934, played right- in the 2–2 draw with Leeds in the 1934–35 Yorkshire County Cup Final replay during the 1934–35 season at Fartown Ground, Huddersfield on Wednesday 31 October 1934, played right- in the 0–13 defeat by Leeds in the 1934–35 Yorkshire County Cup Final second replay during the 1934–35 season at Parkside, Hunslet on Wednesday 7 November 1934, played right- in the 2–9 defeat by York in the 1936–37 Yorkshire County Cup Final during the 1936–37 season at Headingley Rugby Stadium, Leeds on Saturday 17 October 1936, played , i.e. number 5, in the 9–12 defeat by Featherstone Rovers in the 1940–41 Yorkshire County Cup Final during the 1939–40 season at Odsal Stadium, Bradford on Saturday 22 June 1940, and played left-, i.e. number 11, in the 10–0 victory over Hull F.C. in the 1946–47 Yorkshire County Cup Final during the 1946–47 season at Headingley Rugby Stadium, Leeds on Saturday 31 November 1946.

Notable tour matches
Mick Exley played right-, i.e. number 12, in Wakefield Trinity's 6–17 defeat by Australia in the 1933–34 Kangaroo tour of Great Britain match during the 1933–34 season at Belle Vue, Wakefield on Saturday 28 October 1933.

Club career
Mick Exley made his début for Wakefield Trinity during April 1929, he played his last match, during his second spell, for Wakefield Trinity during April 1947, he appears to have scored no drop-goals (or field-goals as they are currently known in Australasia), but prior to the 1974–75 season all goals, whether; conversions, penalties, or drop-goals, scored 2-points, consequently prior to this date drop-goals were often not explicitly documented, therefore '0' drop-goals may indicate drop-goals not recorded, rather than no drop-goals scored. In addition, prior to the 1949–50 season, the archaic field-goal was also still a valid means of scoring points.

Coaching career

Club career
Mick Exley was the coach of Batley from July 1947 to January 1948, he left due to other business commitments.

Outside of rugby league
Mick Exley was the Landlord of the Commercial Inn, Thornes Lane, Wakefield from 1945 until 1952, and later the Black Swan, Castleford Road, Normanton.

Note
As can be seen from the birth details at FreeBMD, there is no mention of "Mick", or "Michael" in his birth registration.

References

External links

1911 births
1990 deaths
Batley Bulldogs captains
Batley Bulldogs coaches
Batley Bulldogs players
England national rugby league team players
English rugby league coaches
English rugby league players
English rugby union players
Great Britain national rugby league team players
Rugby league players from Wakefield
Rugby league second-rows
Rugby league wingers
Rugby union players from Wakefield
Wakefield Trinity captains
Wakefield Trinity players
Yorkshire rugby league team players